Seay Nunatak is a nunatak standing 3 nautical miles (6 km) south of Hill Nunatak at the southeast extremity of the Neptune Range, Pensacola Mountains. Mapped by United States Geological Survey (USGS) from surveys and U.S. Navy air photos, 1956–66. Named by Advisory Committee on Antarctic Names (US-ACAN) for William K. Seay, utilities man at Ellsworth Station, winter 1958.

Nunataks of Queen Elizabeth Land